Courtland is a surname and given name which may refer to:

 Courtland Bullard (born 1978), American former National Football League player
 Courtland C. Gillen (1880-1954), American politician and lawyer
 Courtland C. Matson (1841-1915), American politician, lawyer and colonel in the American Civil War
 Courtland Mead (born 1987), American actor
 Courtland Sutton (born 1995), American football player
 Courtland Winn (1863–1940), American politician and lawyer, mayor of Atlanta, Georgia
 Jerome Courtland (1926–2012), American actor, director and producer
 Karen Courtland (born 1970), American retired pair skater

See also
 Cortland Finnegan (born 1984), American retired National Football League player